Little Wildcat is a 1922 American silent comedy film featuring Oliver Hardy.

Plot

Cast
 Alice Calhoun as Mag o' the Alley
 Ramsey Wallace as Judge Arnold
 Herbert Fortier as Robert Ware
 Oliver Hardy as 'Bull' Mulligan
 Adele Farrington as Mrs. Wilding
 Arthur Hoyt as Mr. Wilding
 Frank Hall Crane as Jack Wilding (as Frank Crane)
Jim Farley as Pete (as James Farley)
 Henry Hebert as Captain Carl Herman
 Maude Emory as Babette (as Maud Emery)

See also
 List of American films of 1922
 Oliver Hardy filmography

External links

1922 films
American black-and-white films
Silent American comedy films
Vitagraph Studios films
1922 comedy films
1920s American films